TECO Chemicals AS is a specialist supplier of chemical services to the maritime industry. The range of products and services includes tank cleaning, raw materials, cleaning equipment and supercargo services.

The company was founded and is controlled by TECO Maritime Group AS. The company is based at Lysaker outside Oslo, Norway but has service offices in Houston, US, Rotterdam, the Netherlands and Singapore.

The company started in 1994 with sale of ship cleaning products. In 1997 it bought 50% of Den-Sin Cleaning Systems (sold again in 2000) and listed the same year on Oslo Stock Exchange. In 1998 it bought Marine Trans and Marine Kurer. Strømme Ship Service was merged with in 2000 and the company briefly changed its name to Strømme TECO, though the same year the companies were again demerged.

Business services companies of Norway
Manufacturing companies of Norway
Engineering companies of Norway
Norwegian companies established in 1994
Companies based in Bærum